The Eagle AC-7 Eagle 1 (USAF designation YE-5) is an aircraft that was manufactured by Windecker Industries. It was the first composite airplane (foam and fiberglass construction) to receive FAA certification in December 1969 at a reported development cost of US$20,000,000. The fiberglass process was named "Fibaloy" by Windecker.

Design and development
The Eagle's fuselage was molded in two pieces that were joined down the middle.  The first prototype had a fixed undercarriage but the second, known as the Eagle 1, had retractable tricycle gear. This aircraft first flew on 26 January 1969. One prototype spun in on testing. 

Only eight Eagles were produced before production ended when the company ran out of money.

No Eagle had been flying for many years, but one was restored and flown in December 2015, by Don Atchison, Mike Moore and a team commissioned by Chinese entrepreneur Wei Hang. Wei Hang holds the rights and the type certificate and plans to produce the aircraft in China for Asian sales.

Specifications

References 

 

 Burmeier, Beverly. "Plastic Fantastic." The History Channel Magazine, September/October, 2005, pp. 22–23.
 "The Eagle Returns", Private Pilot Magazine, Sept. 1978.

External links 
 Windecker Eagle I article at Smithsonian National Air and Space Museum
 Windecker Eagle stealth prototypes at Eagle Behind the Curtain

1960s United States civil utility aircraft
Eagle
Low-wing aircraft
Aircraft first flown in 1967
Single-engined tractor aircraft